Nordic Journal of International Law is peer-reviewed journal published by Brill Nijhoff. It focuses on topic related to Nordic countries and its legal topics.

First number issued in 1930.

See also
Retfærd

References

Law journals
Publications established in 1930
Nordic countries